West Warwick Reservoir is located in the London Borough of Waltham Forest at Walthamstow. The storage reservoir is part of the Lee Valley Reservoir Chain, which supplies drinking water to London. It is owned by Thames Water.

History 
The reservoir was constructed by the East London Waterworks Company in the mid-19th century on former marshland.

Ecology 
The reservoir is part of Walthamstow Reservoirs, which is a Site of Special Scientific Interest (SSSI).

Recreation
The reservoir is popular with birdwatchers, anglers and naturalists, but access is by permit only.

See also 
 London water supply infrastructure

References

External links 
Photograph of reservoir

Sites of Special Scientific Interest in London
Thames Water reservoirs
Reservoirs in London
Drinking water reservoirs in England